Young Oon Kim (1914–1989) was a leading theologian of the Unification Church and its first missionary to the United States.

Career
Kim was a professor of religion at Ewha University in Seoul, South Korea. After she joined the Unification Church, church founder Sun Myung Moon sent her to the United States as a missionary in January 1959.  In the 1960s, while a missionary in Oregon and California, she worked to promote Unification Church theology to mainstream Christian churches.  She was also the first person to translate the Divine Principle, the basic textbook of Unification Church teaching, from Korean to English.  From  1975 to 1988 she was a Professor of Systematic Theology at the Unification Theological Seminary in Barrytown, New York, and the first Unification Church member on the faculty there.

Works
A study of symbols and allegories in the Fourth Gospel, 1951,  Victoria University, Toronto
The Divine Principles, 1963, The Holy Spirit Association for the Unification of World Christianity (Unification Church)
Divine Principle and its Application, 1980, The Holy Spirit Association for the Unification of World Christianity
For God's Sake, 1972, The Holy Spirit Association for the Unification of World Christianity
World Religions: Living religions of the Middle East, 1976, Golden Gate Publishing Company
World Religions: India's religious quest, 1976, Golden Gate Publishing Company
World Religions: Faiths of the Far East, 1976, Golden Gate Publishing Company
Unification theology & Christian thought, 1976, Golden Gate Publishing Company
Unification Theology, 1980, The Holy Spirit Association for the Unification of World Christianity
New methods of group Bible study in Korea: with focus on the Korean Methodist Church, 1982, San Francisco Theological Seminary
The Types of Modern Theology, 1983, The Holy Spirit Association for the Unification of World Christianity
An introduction to theology, 1983, The Holy Spirit Association for the Unification of World Christianity
Unification theology in comparative perspectives, 1988, Unification Theological Seminary

See also
Unification Church of the United States

References

External links
Unification Theology, Young Oon Kim, 1980
The Reverend Sun Myung Moon I Know, Young Oon Kim, 1988

American people of Korean descent
American theologians
South Korean Unificationists
1989 deaths
1914 births
People from Barrytown, New York
20th-century American writers